Pa Bon is a district (amphoe) of Phatthalung province, southern Thailand.

Geography
Neighboring districts are (from the north clockwise) Tamot, Bang Kaeo, and Pak Phayun of Phatthalung Province, Rattaphum of Songkhla province, Khuan Kalong of Satun province and Palian of Trang province.

History
The minor district was established on 1 May 1983, when the three tambons Pa Bon, Nong Thong, and Khok Sai were split off from Pak Phayun district. It was upgraded to a full district on 21 May 1990.

Administration
The district is divided into five sub-districts (tambons), which are further subdivided into 48 villages (mubans). Pa Bon is a township (thesaban tambon) which covers parts of the tambon Pa Bon, Nong Thong and Wang Mai. There are a further five tambon administrative organizations (TAO).

Geocode 5 is not used.

References

External links
amphoe.com

Districts of Phatthalung province